The Grail & the Lotus is the second studio album by composer and guitarist Robbie Basho, released in 1966 by Takoma Records.

Release and reception
The album was produced by Ed Denson.

Richie Unterberger of Allmusic gave the album four and a half out of five stars, stating that The Grail & the Lotus is "a fine, innovative album"

Despite never being individually issued on Compact Disc, The Grail & the Lotus can be found in its entirety on the Guitar Soli compilation album.

Track listing

Personnel
Adapted from The Grail & the Lotus liner notes.
Robbie Basho – steel-string acoustic guitar, vocals
ED Denson – production
Tom Weller – illustrations

Release history

References

External links 
 

1966 albums
Robbie Basho albums
Takoma Records albums